De-Leninization is political reform aimed at refuting Leninist and Marxist–Leninist ideology, ending the personality cult of Vladimir Lenin, removing images and toppling statues of Lenin, renaming places and buildings, dismantling the Lenin Mausoleum currently in Red Square, Moscow, and burying his mummified corpse.  

De-Stalinization began in the former Soviet Union in the mid-1950s during the Khrushchev thaw following the latter's secret speech "On the Cult of Personality and Its Consequences".  But this was framed as a return to orthodox Leninism and thus the cult of Lenin remained until the dissolution of the USSR, when public challenges to the cult and its ideology and iconography began.

In post-Communist Russia 
A referendum on reversing the renaming of Leningrad was held on 12 June 1991, with 54.86% of voters (with a turnout of 65%) supporting "Saint Petersburg". Renaming the city Petrograd was not an option. This change officially took effect on 6 September 1991. Meanwhile, the oblast whose administrative center is also in Saint Petersburg is still named Leningrad.

In 1992, Lenin's likeness disappeared from the currency as Russia's bank system transitioned to the Russian Ruble.

There was some reform in education, and Lenin's name began to disappear from books, articles, and dissertations. 

Former Soviet colonel general turned historian Dmitri Volkogonov gained access to the State Archive of the Russian Federation and wrote critical biographies of both Stalin and Lenin.  He had previously been a head of the Soviet military's psychological warfare department.

But there was only partial and intermittent removal of his statues and likenesses in Russia. As historian Yury Pivovarov notes, “All these metamorphoses predominantly took place in publishing, on TV and the radio… the dismantling of Lenin happened only verbally and almost didn’t materialize in any other way.”

Russia's first president Boris Yeltsin tried and failed to establish the new regime on a basis of Anti-communism. Russian president Vladimir Putin made peace with the Communists when he came to power in 2000, but after his 2012 election began denouncing the Bolsheviks for their treachery in "betraying the country's national interests" to Germany in World War I. In 2016, he critiqued Lenin's concept of a federative state divided along ethnic lines, each with a right of secession. Various public figures also denounced Lenin for executing the czar and his family and for killing priests. A 2017 survey showed that 56% of Russia's population had a favorable opinion of Lenin, with the majority of support coming from the older generation that lived in the USSR.

In 2012, the state-sponsored Russia Today media network reported that Liberal-Democratic party (LDPR) deputy Aleksandr Kurdyumov proposed the removal of monuments to museums, citing high maintenance costs due to the prevalence of vandalism, and saying that Lenin's dominance was "unfair” to other outstanding personalities – such as Peter the Great, Alexander Suvorov, Ivan the Terrible and others. The lawmaker proposed regional referendums to decide the question.

Lenin's Mausoleum controversy 
Many have proposed burying Lenin's corpse and dismantling the Lenin Mausoleum, including Mikhail Gorbachev, Boris Yeltsin, and hierophants of the Russian Orthodox Church.  In 2017, legislation was proposed by six lawmakers, including 3 from Putin's United Russia Party and three from the LDPR, but was opposed by the Russian Communist Party.  The embalming and Mausoleum had been opposed from its outset by Leon Trotsky, Bukharin, Kamenev, by Lenin's widow Nadezhda Krupskaya, and reportedly by Lenin himself before his premature death.

In Ukraine and other post-Soviet states 
After the dissolution of the USSR other post-Soviet states also began removing many of their Lenin monuments, although some have remained. In 1991, Ukraine had 5,500 Lenin monuments, and until November 2015, approximately 1,300 Lenin monuments were still standing. More than 700 Lenin monuments were removed or destroyed between February 2014 and December 2015, On 9 April 2015, the Ukrainian parliament passed legislation on de-communization, which provided for their removal, signed into law on 15 May 2015.

See also 
 Decommunization
 Anti-communism
 Demolition of the Vladimir Lenin monument in Kyiv
 Muzeon Park of Arts
 Good Bye, Lenin!
 David Shub exiled social democrat revolutionary who wrote  an early critical biography of Lenin.
 Leon Trotsky Bolshevik revolutionary, exponent of anti-Leninist Trotskyism

References

Books

Articles and Reviews 
 
 
 

De-Stalinization
Politics of the Soviet Union
Leninism
Marxism–Leninism